Bean's critical state model, introduced by C. P. Bean in 1962, gives a macroscopic explanation of the irreversible magnetization behavior (hysteresis) of hard Type-II superconductors.

Assumptions
Hard superconductors often exhibit hysteresis in magnetization measurements. C. P. Bean postulated for the Shubnikov phase an extraordinary shielding process due to the microscopic structure of the materials. He assumed lossless transport with a critical current density Jc(B) (Jc(B→0) = const. and Jc(B→∞) = 0). An external magnetic field is shielded in the Meissner phase (H < Hc1) in the same way than in a soft superconductor. In the Shubnikov phase (Hc1 < H < Hc2), the critical current flows below the surface within a depth necessary to reduce the field in the inside of the superconductor to Hc1.

Explanation of the irreversible magnetization

To understand the origin of the irreversible magnetization: assume a hollow cylinder in an external magnetic field parallel to the cylinder axis. In the Meissner phase, a screening current is within the London penetration depth. Exceeding Hc1, vortices start to penetrate into the superconductor. These vortices are pinned on the surface (Bean–Livingston barrier). In the area below the surface, which is penetrated by the vortices, is a current with the density Jc. At low fields (H < H0), the vortices do not reach the inner surface of the hollow cylinder and the interior stays field-free. For H > H0, the vortices penetrate the whole cylinder and a magnetic field appears in the interior, which then increases with increasing external field. Let us now consider what happens, if the external field is then decreased: Due to induction, an opposed critical current is generated at the outer surface of the cylinder keeping inside the magnetic field for H0 < H < H1 constant. For H > H1, the opposed critical current penetrates the whole cylinder and the inner magnetic field starts to decrease with decreasing external field. When the external field vanishes, a remnant internal magnetic field occurs (comparable to the remanent magnetization of a ferromagnet). With an opposed external field H0, the internal magnetic field finally reaches 0T (H0 equates the coercive field of a ferromagnet).

Extension of Bean’s model
Bean assumed a constant critical current meaning that H << Hc2. Kim et al. extended the model assuming 1/J(H) proportional to H, yielding excellent agreement of theory and measurements on Nb3Sn tubes. Different geometries have to be considered as the irreversible magnetization depends on the sample geometry.

References

See also

Superconductivity
Magnetic hysteresis